Tony Barnes (born 16 May 1956) is a former Australian rules footballer who represented the Melbourne Football Club in the Victorian Football League (VFL) during the 1980s.

Barnes played 7 games across his two seasons with the Demons before being delisted.

References

1956 births
Living people
Melbourne Football Club players
Seymour Football Club players
Australian rules footballers from Victoria (Australia)